Gianfrancesco Sormani or Giovanni Francesco Sormani (died 1601) was an Italian Roman Catholic bishop.

He was appointed Bishop of Montefeltro on March 6, 1567, a position he held uintil his death in 1601. While bishop, he was the principal consecrator of Franjo Župan, Bishop of Kotor (1579).

References

Bishops of Montefeltro
Year of birth missing
1601 deaths